Alterity is a philosophical and anthropological term meaning "otherness", that is, the "other of two" (Latin alter). It is also increasingly being used in media to express something other than "sameness", or something outside of tradition or convention.

Philosophy
Within the phenomenological tradition, alterity is usually understood as the entity in contrast to which an identity is constructed, and it implies the ability to distinguish between self and not-self, and consequently to assume the existence of an alternative viewpoint. The concept was further developed by Emmanuel Levinas in a series of essays, collected in Altérité et transcendance (Alterity and Transcendence) (1995).

Castoriadis
For Cornelius Castoriadis (L'institution imaginaire de la société, 1975; The Imaginary Institution of Society, 1997) radical alterity/otherness denotes the element of creativity in history: "For what is given in and through history is not the determined sequence of the determined but the emergence of radical otherness, immanent creation, non-trivial novelty."

Baudrillard
For Jean Baudrillard (Figures de l'alterité, 1994; Radical Alterity, 2008), alterity is a precious and transcendent element and its loss would seriously impoverish a world culture of increasing sameness and "arrogant, insular cultural narcissism."

Spivak

Gayatri Chakravorty Spivak's theory of alterity was introduced in a 2014 symposium titled Remaking History, the intention of which was to challenge the masculine orthodoxy of history writing.

According to Spivak, it is imperative for one to uncover the histories and inherent historical behaviors in order to exercise an individual right to authentic experience, identity and reality. Within the concept of socially constructed histories one "must take into account the dangerous fragility and tenacity of these concept-metaphors."

Spivak recalls her personal history: "As a postcolonial, I am concerned with the appropriation of 'alternative history' or 'histories'.  I am not a historian by training.  I cannot claim disciplinary expertise in remaking history in the sense of rewriting it.  But I can be used as an example of how historical narratives are negotiated.  The parents of my parents' grandparents' grandparents were made over, not always without their consent, by the political, fiscal and educational intervention of British imperialism, and now I am independent.  Thus I am, in the strictest sense, a postcolonial."

Spivak uses four "master words" to identify the modes of being that create alterity: "Nationalism, Internationalism, Secularism and Culturalism."  Furthermore, tools for developing alternative histories include: "gender, race, ethnicity, class".

Other thinkers
Jeffery Nealon, in Alterity Politics: Ethics and Performative Subjectivity, argues that "ethics is constituted as an inexorable affirmative response to different identities, not through an inability to understand or totalize the other."

There is included a long article on alterity in the University of Chicago's Theories of Media: Keywords Glossary by Joshua Wexler. Wexler writes: "Given the various theorists formulations presented here, the mediation of alterity or otherness in the world provides a space for thinking about the complexities of self and other and the formation of identity."

The concept of alterity is also being used in theology and in spiritual books meant for general readers.  This is not out of place because, for believers in the Judeo-Christian tradition, God is the ultimate 'Other'.  Alterity has also been used to describe the goal of many Christians, to become themselves deeply "other" than the usual norms of behavior and patterns of thought of the secular culture at large. Enzo Bianchi in Echoes of the Word expresses this well, "Meditation always seeks to open us to alterity, love and communion by guiding us toward the goal of having in ourselves the same attitude and will that were in Christ Jesus."

Jadranka Skorin-Kapov in The Aesthetics of Desire and Surprise: Phenomenology and Speculation, relates alterity or otherness to newness and surprise, "The signification of the encounter with otherness is not in its novelty (or banal newness); on the contrary, newness has signification because it reveals otherness, because it allows the experience of otherness. Newness is related to surprise, it is a consequence of the encounter... Metaphysical desire is the acceptivity of irreducible otherness. Surprise is the consequence of the encounter. Between desire and surprise there is a pause, a void, a rupture, an immediacy that cannot be captured and presented."

Anthropology
In anthropology, alterity has been used by scholars such as Nicholas Dirks, Johannes Fabian, Michael Taussig and Pauline Turner Strong to refer to the construction of "cultural others".

Musicology
The term has gained further use in seemingly somewhat remote disciplines, e.g., historical musicology where it is employed by John Michael Cooper in a study of Johann Wolfgang von Goethe and Felix Mendelssohn.

See also

Abjection
Decolonization
Heterogeneity
Heterophenomenology
Imperialism
Indeterminacy in philosophy
Internationalism
Nationalism
Other
Pedagogy
Postcolonialism
Secularism
Self-consciousness
Subjectivity
Uncanny

References

Further reading
Martin Buber (1937), I and Thou.
Chan-Fai Cheung, Tze-Wan Kwan and  Kwok-ying Lau (eds.), Identity and Alterity. Phenomenology and Cultural Traditions. Verlag Königshausen & Neumann, Würzburg 2009 (Orbis Phaenomenologicusm, Perspektiven, Neue Folge Band 14) 
Cooper, John Michael (2007) Mendelssohn, Goethe, and the Walpurgis Night. University of Rochester Press.
Fabian, Johannes (1983) Time and the Other: How Anthropology Makes Its Object. Columbia University Press.
Levinas, Emmanuel (1999[1970]) Alterity and Transcendence. (Trans. Michael B. Smith) Columbia University Press.
Maranhao, Tullio (ed.), Anthropology and the Question of the Other. Paideuma 44 (1998).
Nealon, Jeffrey (1998) Alterity Politics: Ethics and Performative Subjectivity. Duke University Press.
Půtová, B.: Freak Shows. Otherness of the Human Body as a Form of Public Presentation. Anthropologie: International Journal of Human Diversity and Evolution 56(2), 2018, s. 91–102
Strong, Pauline Turner (1999) Captive Selves, Captivating Others: The Politics and Poetics of Colonial American Captivity *Narratives. Westview Press/Perseus Books.
Taussig, Michael (1993) Mimesis and Alterity. Routledge.
Otherness - Dictionary of war

External links

Continental philosophy
Post-structuralism
Postmodern theory
Critical theory